District 7 is an  urban district of Ho Chi Minh City, the largest city in Vietnam. As of 2010, the district had a population of 274,828 and an area of 36 km².

District 7 is connected to the city of Thủ Đức by the Phú Mỹ Bridge, which opened in September 2009. The Phú Mỹ Hưng New City is located in the district.

Administration
District 7 consists of 10 wards (phường):

Education

Primary Schools

Secondary schools

Universities 
 RMIT University Vietnam has a campus in Tân Phong. RMIT is a university from Melbourne, Australia, operating several campuses in Vietnam with approximately 7000 students and 650 staffs.
 Tôn Đức Thắng University is located in Tân Phong.

References 

Districts of Ho Chi Minh City